KANI (1500 AM) is a radio station broadcasting a Gospel format. Licensed to Wharton, Texas, United States, it serves the Houston, Texas area.  The station is currently owned by Martin Broadcasting.

History
KANI was first proposed, and a construction permit issued by the Federal Communications Commission in 1975 by Beverly Ann Irish, under the licensee name of Radio Wharton County, Inc. The facility was licensed on September 1, 1978 at its current 500 watts, from a transmission site 1.4 miles east & .4 miles north of Wharton Junior College.

Martin Broadcasting, the current owner of KANI, acquired the facility on September 12, 1990.

External links

ANI
Gospel radio stations in the United States
ANI
Radio stations established in 1983